The State University of New York College of Optometry is a public school of optometry in New York City.  It is part of the State University of New York (SUNY) system and was established in 1971 as result of a legislative mandate of New York. It is located in midtown Manhattan in what was originally the Aeolian Building, which was built in 1912 for the Aeolian Company, a piano manufacturer. It is a center for research on vision and the only school of optometry in New York.

The college grants a professional degree, the Doctor of Optometry (O.D.), and two academic degrees, the Master of Science (M.S.) in Vision Science and the Doctor of Philosophy (Ph.D.) in Vision Science. Continuing education courses for practicing optometrists are also provided by the College.

The University Eye Center provides eye care, corrective lenses, and vision therapy to the public. The University Eye Center is one of the largest outpatient eye clinics in the country, with over 73,000 patient encounters in FY 2012-13.

The Optometric Center of New York, established in 1956, is a foundation affiliated with the college to support vision science research, patient care, scholarships, and fellowships at the College and its clinical facilities.

The college offers residencies to optometrists from around the world including specializations in subfields of optometry.

The college enrolls between 80-100 optometry students per year in the professional degree program.  About 20 of these students also seek an M.S. degree in Vision Science across the four years. The College also offers a Ph.D. in Vision Science and provides twelve graduate stipends per year.

Research and graduate programs at the college are administered through the Graduate Center for Vision Research, which currently receives nearly $4 million in annual funding for research grants. Clinical research is conducted through the Clinical Vision Research Center.

The college is a member of the SUNY Eye Institute.

References

External links

Optometry schools in the United States
Optometry
Universities and colleges in New York City
Educational institutions established in 1971
Universities and colleges in Manhattan
1971 establishments in New York City
42nd Street (Manhattan)
Optometry